House of Pleasure for Women is a 1976  satirical comedy film written and directed by  Pupi Avati and starring Gigi Proietti, Christian De Sica, Gianni Cavina, Al Lettieri and Vincent Gardenia.

Plot
A brothel for women is opened in Milan, Italy.

Cast 
Gigi Proietti as Ivano Zuccoli 
Christian De Sica as Count Ugolino Facchini
Al Lettieri as Eddie Mordace
Gianni Cavina as  Adone Tonti
Vincent Gardenia as Mr. Chips 
Taryn Power as Olimpia
George Eastman as  Luciano aka "Sinbad"
Vladek Sheybal as Francesco 
Maurizio Bonuglia as Gualtiero
Rosemarie Lindt as  Gualtiero's Wife 
Elisa Mainardi as  Luciana Muccioli
Greta Vaillant
Troy Beasley as Silkio Luciano

Production
House of Pleasure for Women was shot in 1975.

Release
House of Pleasure for Women was released in early 1976.

See also 
 List of Italian films of 1976

Footnotes

References

External links

Italian comedy films
Italian satirical films
1976 comedy films
1976 films
Films directed by Pupi Avati
Films about prostitution in Italy
Films with screenplays by Maurizio Costanzo
1970s Italian films